Moheibacter stercoris is a Gram-negative and rod-shaped bacterium from the genus of Moheibacter which has been isolated from a biogas plant from Germany.

References

Flavobacteria
Bacteria described in 2016